11 July 2006 Srinagar bombings consisted of five grenade attacks by militants, killing 8 people and injuring 43 in Srinagar, Jammu and Kashmir.

Attacks
The attack took place within an hour of the departure of Prime Minister Manmohan Singh's conclusion of a two-day round table conference. The first attack occurred at 11:40 am when a grenade was thrown into a minibus carrying tourists from Bengal.  Five people, died and another 10 were injured.  The dead included a mother, her son and her daughter-in-law. At 12:40 pm, another grenade was lobbed at a car with a Haryana registration number.  Three bystanders were injured.  At 1:10 pm, another grenade was thrown at a van carrying tourists in Lal Chowk.  One person died and several were injured. A small boy named Hardik lost his leg in the explosion. The last grenade was thrown at a taxi stand at 3:00 pm .

Aftermath
Mohammad Afzal of the Baramulla district, who allegedly threw the grenade, was caught by onlookers and handed over to the police.  He confessed to be a member of Lashkar-e-Taiba These bombings happened on the same day as 11 July 2006 Mumbai train bombings and were overshadowed by them.

Reaction
UN secretary general Kofi Annan condemned both the attacks saying "Such Acts Cannot Possibly Be Excused by any Grievance"

See also
 2013 Srinagar attack
 2001 Jammu and Kashmir legislative assembly attack
 2013 CRPF camp attack at Bemina

References

21st-century mass murder in India
Improvised explosive device bombings in India
Mass murder in 2006
Terrorist incidents in India in 2006
Islamic terrorism in India
2006 in India
Srinagar
2000s in Jammu and Kashmir
Religiously motivated violence in India
Massacres in Jammu and Kashmir
Manmohan Singh administration
Islamic terrorist incidents in 2006